The  is a type of 4-6-2 steam locomotive built in Japan from 1928 to 1929 designed by Hideo Shima and built by Kawasaki Heavy Industries Rolling Stock Company  Kisha Seizo  and Mitsubishi Heavy Industries and Hitachi . A total of 97 Class C53 locomotives were built they operated until all 97 were retired in 1950.  C53 45 is  the only example of the class to be preserved.

Preserved examples
Today, only one Class C53 locomotive has been preserved in Japan, C53 45, at the Kyoto Railway Museum (formerly Umekoji Steam Locomotive Museum).

See also
 Japan Railways locomotive numbering and classification
JNR Class C52
JNR Class C54

References

1067 mm gauge locomotives of Japan
Steam locomotives of Japan
4-6-2 locomotives
Preserved steam locomotives of Japan
Railway locomotives introduced in 1928
Passenger locomotives